Thryophilus is a genus of wrens in the Troglodytidae (wren) family. It contains five species, which were previously classified in Thryothorus.

Species
The following species are currently recognized by the International Ornithological Congress:
 Banded wren (Thryophilus pleurostictus) Sclater, 1860
 Rufous-and-white wren (Thryophilus rufalbus) Lafresnaye, 1845
 Niceforo's wren (Thryophilus nicefori) Meyer de Schauensee, 1946
 Sinaloa wren (Thryophilus sinaloa) (Baird, 1864)
 Antioquia wren (Thryophilus sernai) Lara et al., 2012

References

External links 

 
Troglodytidae
Bird genera
Higher-level bird taxa restricted to the Neotropics